Able Treasury was the first studio album from the Scottish indie rock band AC Acoustics.

Track listing
 Mother Head Sander
 King Dick
 Three
 Leather Buyer
 Fat Abbey
 Sister Grab Operator
 Oregon Pine Washback
 M.V.
 Sweatlodge

References

1994 debut albums
AC Acoustics albums

sv:Barbed Wire Kisses